Ram Mandir railway station (station code: RMAR) is a railway station on the Western and Harbour lines of the Mumbai Suburban Railway, serving the Oshiwara locality. The station is located in between Jogeshwari railway station and Goregaon railway station and is named after the century-old temple of Lord Ram in its vicinity. The station was opened to commuters on 22 December 2016.

History 
The Ram Mandir Road station, the 37th station on the Western Line, was inaugurated on 22 December 2016, by Railway Minister Suresh Prabhu, after seemingly interminable stages of construction since 2008.

The distance between Jogeshwari and Goregaon stations were long enough,Hence this station was created.

The station has four platforms, two each for Western line slow trains and two for Harbour line section.

The station got its name from a 150 year old temple of Lord Ram. The temple is located on sprawling grounds, in Goregaon West, and its weathered dome lends it a pleasant patina of age. A signboard inside the temple informs visitors that it was renovated in 1897, and residents say that a temple existed at the current location prior to that year. The idols—of Lord Ram, Lakshman and Sita—inside the sanctum sanctorum of the smaller temple, were transferred to the renovated structure.

References

Railway stations in India opened in 2016
2016 establishments in Maharashtra
Railway stations in Mumbai Suburban district
Mumbai Suburban Railway stations
Mumbai WR railway division